WGS-11+ or Wideband Global SATCOM 11+ is a United States military communications satellite to be operated by the United States Space Force as part of the Wideband Global SATCOM Program. Scheduled for 2024, it is the eleventh WGS satellite and is planned to be in geostationary orbit. WGS-11+ was purchased by the United States Air Force.

Overview 
The WGS system is composed of three principal segments: the Space Segment (satellites), the Control Segment (operators), and the Terminal Segment (users). Each WGS satellite provides service in multiple frequency bands, with the unprecedented ability to cross-band between the two frequencies on board the satellite. WGS augments other satellites.

In early 2001, a satellite communications industry team led by Boeing Satellite Systems was selected to develop the Wideband Gap filler Satellite (WGS) system as a successor to the Defense Satellite Communications System (DSCS) series of communications satellites. This satellite communications system is intended to support the warfighter with newer and far greater capabilities than provided by current systems. In March 2007, the acronym WGS was changed to Wideband Global SATCOM.

One WGS satellite provides more SATCOM capacity than the entire legacy Defense Satellite Communications System (DSCS) constellation.

Satellite description 
In March 2018, U.S. Congress added US$605 million of funds for two more satellites, WGS-11 and WGS-12, which were not requested before. This resulted in the order of WGS-11+ in April 2019 for a 2023 launch. This satellite will be based on the BSS-702X variant of Boeing's commercial 702 satellite line that will provide improved signal power and bandwidth efficiency compared to earlier WGS satellites. The U.S. Space Force will launch the craft and will perform the command-and-control functions during its 14-year life expectancy. Built by Boeing Satellite Systems, WGS-11+ is based on the BSS-702X satellite bus. The spacecraft is equipped with two solar panels to generate power for its communications payload, which consists of cross-band X-band and Ka-band transponders. Propulsion will be provided by an R-4D-15 apogee motor, with four XIPS-25 ion engines for station keeping.

Launch 
WGS-11+ will be launched in 2024 on a Vulcan Centaur rocket from Cape Canaveral SLC-41.

References 

USA satellites
2024 in spaceflight
Wideband Global SATCOM
Communications satellites in geostationary orbit